Leichtes Blut (Light of Heart), Op. 319, is a polka composed by Johann Strauss II. It was first performed at a benefit concert at the Vienna Volksgarten in March 1867.

References

Compositions by Johann Strauss II
1867 compositions
Polkas
Compositions set in Vienna